As Long as I Have You is the tenth solo album by Roger Daltrey, released on 1 June 2018.

Overview
Work on As Long as I Have You was started shortly after Going Back Home was released in March 2014. Following his seven-month battle with viral meningitis, Daltrey planned on shelving the project until Pete Townshend heard the early mixes and expressed interest in playing rhythm and lead guitar. Recording continued during breaks on The Who's 50th anniversary tour, The Who Hits 50!

As Long as I Have You features Townshend's guitar on seven tracks as well as guest performances from Mick Talbot on keyboards and Sean Genockey on lead guitar.

The album is a mixture of self-penned tracks such as "Certified Rose" and the soulful ballad "Always Heading Home" along with songs that have inspired Daltrey over the years including Nick Cave's "Into My Arms", "You Haven't Done Nothing" by Stevie Wonder, Stephen Stills' "How Far" and the title track originally recorded by Garnet Mimms in 1964, the year that Roger Daltrey, Pete Townshend, John Entwistle and Keith Moon changed their name from The High Numbers and became The Who.

Release
As Long as I Have You is available on a number of formats: CD, 180g black vinyl, limited 180g red vinyl housed in a Polydor disco bag, and digitally (download and streaming). All those who pre-ordered the album in any format were also entered in a contest to receive one out of ten test vinyl pressings signed by Daltrey.

Critical reception

As Long as I Have You received generally positive reviews from critics. At Metacritic, which assigns a normalized rating out of 100 to reviews from mainstream publications, the album received an average score of 76 based on 8 reviews. Aggregator Album of the Year gave the release a 61 out of 100 based on a critical consensus of 6 reviews.

Track listing

Personnel
Roger Daltrey – lead vocals (all tracks)
Pete Townshend – acoustic & electric guitars (tracks 1-5, 7, 9)
John Hogg – bass (tracks 1-4, 7-10); acoustic guitar (tracks 2, 9); backing vocals (tracks 1-4)
Jeremy Stacey – drums & percussion (tracks 1-4, 7-8, 10)
Regina McCrary – backing vocals (tracks 1, 3-5, 7-8, 10); tambourine (track 4)
Beverly Ann McCrary – backing vocals (tracks 1, 3-5, 7-8, 10)
Alfreda McCrary – backing vocals (tracks 1, 3-5, 7-8, 10)
Deborah McCrary – backing vocals (tracks 1, 3-5, 7-8, 10)
Matt Holland – trumpet (tracks 1, 7-10); all brass arrangements
Martin Winning – saxophone (tracks 1, 4, 7-10)
Roy Agee – trombone (tracks 1, 7-8, 10)
David Catlin-Birch – bass (track 5)
Liam Genockey – drums (tracks 5, 9)
Jon Button – double bass (tracks 6, 11)
Barnaby Dickinson – trombone (tracks 8-9)
Geraint Watkins – piano (track 11)
Andy Cutting – melodian (track 11)
Ian Burdge – cello (track 11)
Dave Eringa – additional percussion & programming (tracks 1-5, 7-11); tubular bells (track 6)
Sean Genockey – guitars (as guest musician) [tracks 1-5, 7-10]
Mick Talbot – keyboards (as guest musician) [tracks 1, 3-10]

Charts

See also
Roger Daltrey discography

References

2018 albums
Roger Daltrey albums
Albums produced by Dave Eringa